Chloé Delaume (born Nathalie Dalain in 1973) is a French novelist, performer, musician, and occasional singer.

Biography

Born in Paris, Delaume spent her childhood in Beirut. In 1983, at ten years old, she witnessed her father murder her mother, then kill himself. She then lived with her grandparents, her uncle and aunt. She is the niece of Georges Ibrahim Abdallah.

Delaume enrolled at the Université de Paris X to become a teacher, just like her mother did. Seemingly disappointed by the university's system, Delaume decided to write on her own while getting jobs as a waitress at hostess bars, which prompted her to write her first published novel for Farrago/Léo Scheer editions: Les Mouflettes d'Atropos. She then collaborated under her birth name on the literary magazine Le matricule des anges.

Chloé Delaume is her pen name: the name Chloé hails from the heroine of the novel L'Écume des jours by Boris Vian and her last name, Delaume, comes from Antonin Artaud's writings/play L'Arve et l'Aume.

Life and writing

Chloé Delaume has written various novels in which she uses an original form of poetic research. Apart from writing novels, she composes and collaborates lyrics to Julien Locquet's musical project Dorine Muraille. These collaborations have also spurred multimedia performances.

Le Cri du sablier, won the Prix Décembre in 2001.

Autofiction, technology, biopower, gameplay, literary activism and the struggle against psychosis are some of the prevalent motifs throughout her body of work.

Works
 Les Mouflettes d'Atropos, Éditions Farrago, 2000
 Mes Week-ends sont pires que les vôtres, Éditions du Néant, 2001
 Le Cri du sablier, Éditions farrago/Léo Scheer, 2001
 La Vanité des Somnambules, Éditions Farrago/Léo Scheer, 2003
 Monologue pour épluchures d'Atrides, Éditions du C.I.P.M., 2003
 Corpus Simsi, Éditions Léo Scheer, 2003
 Certainement pas, Éditions Verticales, 2004
 Les Juins ont tous la même peau, Éditions La Chasse au Snark, 2005
 J'habite dans la télévision, Éditions Verticales, 2006
 Neuf Leçons de littérature, 2007
 Chanson de geste & Opinions, Éditions Mac/Val, 2007
 La Dernière Fille avant la guerre, Éditions Naïve Sessions, 2007
 La Nuit je suis Buffy Summers, Éditions èe, 2007
 Transhumances, Éditions èe, 2007
 Dans ma maison sous terre, Seuil (Fiction & cie collection), 2008
 Eden matin midi et soir, Joca Seria, 2009
 Narcisse et ses aiguilles, L'une et l'autre, 2009
 Au commencement était l'adverbe, 2010
 La Règle du je, PUF, 2010
 Sillages, Cadex, 2010
 Le Deuil des deux syllabes, L'une et l'autre, 2011
 Une femme avec personne dedans, Seuil, 2012
 Perceptions, illustrations de François Alary, éditions Joca Seria, 2012
 Où le sang nous appelle, avec Daniel Schneidermann, Seuil, 2013
 Les Sorcières de la République, Seuil, 2016
 Mes Bien Chères Sœurs, Seuil, 2019

External links
 Official Site
 Interview (French)
 Cerisy autofiction symposium speech (French)

References 

1973 births
Living people
Writers from Paris
21st-century French novelists
Prix Décembre winners
French women novelists
French people of Lebanese descent
Paris Nanterre University alumni
Gamebook writers
Prix Médicis winners
21st-century French women